The Australian Sidecar Championship is a speedway championship held each year to determine the Australian national champions. The event is sanctioned and run by Motorcycling Australia (MA) and is held in a different state every year. The Australian Sidecar Championship was first held in 1931 at the Melbourne Exhibition Speedway and was won by Victorian pair Les Medlycott and his passenger "Tich" Jones

The 2013 Australian Speedway Sidecar Championship was held at the Gillman Speedway in Adelaide, South Australia, and was won by Darrin Treloar (NSW) and his Victorian swinger Simon Cohrs. It was a record 7th Australian Championship win for Treloar, while for Cohrs it was his second win.

The 2014 Australian Championship was held at the Loxford Park Speedway in Kurri Kurri, New South Wales, on 28–29 March. Darrin Treloar (NSW) won his 8th Australian Championship, his new passenger Blake Cox scored his first win of this championship.

The 2015 Australian Championship was held at the Arunga Park Speedway in Alice Springs on 4–5 April. It was the first time the  speedway has hosted the championship since 1985. South Australian pair Justin Plaisted and Sam Harrison won the title. For Plaisted, who had won the championship three times as a passenger with Darrin Treloar, it was his first win as a rider.

The 2016 championship was held at the Olympic Park Speedway in Mildura on 8–9 April with NSW pair Darrin Treloar (who won his record 9th title) and Blake Cox taking the win.

The 2017 Australian Championship was held at the Gillman Speedway. South Australia's Trent Headland and his British passenger Darryl Whetstone went one better than they had done in 2016 when they won their first Australian championship with Whetstone also becoming the first non-Australian to win the title.

Winners since 1931 

Prior to 1961, multiple titles were held in the same year at different tracks over 2, 3 or 4 laps1950 (4 lap), 1979, 1984 & 1992 - Ride-off to decide winner after tied on points1998 Results altered at MA tribunal hearing 28 September 1998

See also

Motorsport in Australia
List of Australian motor racing series

References

External links
Australian Sidecar Championship's

Motorsport competitions in Australia
Speedway in Australia
National championships in Australia
Sidecar racing